Adam Bleakney is a paralympic athlete from the United States competing mainly in category T54 wheelchair racing events.

Adam has competed in numerous events at three Paralympics.  He has competed at events from 100m to marathon in the 2000, 2004 and 2008 Summer Paralympics.  He won his sole medal in the 2004 800m where he finished second.

References

External links
 Profile from University of Illinois
 

Paralympic track and field athletes of the United States
Athletes (track and field) at the 2000 Summer Paralympics
Athletes (track and field) at the 2004 Summer Paralympics
Athletes (track and field) at the 2008 Summer Paralympics
Paralympic silver medalists for the United States
American male sprinters
American male middle-distance runners
American male long-distance runners
Living people
Athletes (track and field) at the 2012 Summer Paralympics
Illinois Fighting Illini coaches
Illinois Fighting Illini Paralympic athletes
Medalists at the 2004 Summer Paralympics
American Olympic coaches
Year of birth missing (living people)
Paralympic medalists in athletics (track and field)
American male wheelchair racers